The 2022 U-20 Copa CONMEBOL Libertadores was the 6th edition of the U-20 CONMEBOL Libertadores (also referred to as the U-20 Copa Libertadores), South America's premier under-20 club football tournament organized by CONMEBOL. It was held in Ecuador from 5 to 20 February 2022.

The tournament was played behind closed doors due to the COVID-19 pandemic, except for the final matchday (third place match and final) which had a capacity of 50% allowed in the Estadio Rodrigo Paz Delgado.

Independiente del Valle were the defending champions having won the title in 2020. Peñarol won their first title after beating Independiente del Valle 4–3 on penalties after 1–1 draw in the final match. As winners of the 2022 U-20 Copa Libertadores, Peñarol earned the right to play against Benfica, the winners of the 2021–22 UEFA Youth League, in the 2022 Under-20 Intercontinental Cup which is a single leg match-up officially launched by CONMEBOL and UEFA on 2 June 2022.

Teams
The competition will be contested by 12 teams: the title holders, the youth champions from each of the ten CONMEBOL member associations, and one additional team from the host association.

Venues

Ecuador was named as host country of the tournament at the CONMEBOL Council meeting held on 27 October 2021. The Estadio Olímpico Atahualpa hosted the matches of groups B and C while the Estadio Banco Guayaquil, owned by Independiente del Valle, hosted the group A matches and the semi-finals. On 19 February 2022, the Estadio Rodrigo Paz Delgado, owned by LDU Quito, was included as venue of the third place match and the final that had originally been scheduled at the Estadio Banco Guayaquil. All venues are located in Quito.

Draw
The draw was held on 20 December 2021, 13:30 PYST (UTC−3), at the CONMEBOL Convention Centre in Luque, Paraguay. The draw was conducted according to the following guidelines:

The defending champions Independiente del Valle were automatically assigned to position A1 in the group stage.
The remaining 11 teams were seeded into four pots; one of two teams and three of three teams, based on the final placement of their national association's club in the previous edition of the tournament, and drawn into three groups of four.
The teams from the two best associations (Ecuador and Argentina) were seeded into Pot 1 and drawn to position B1 or C1 in the group stage. The first team drawn was placed into Group B, the second team drawn placed into Group C
The teams from the next three associations (Brazil, Paraguay and Venezuela) were seeded into Pot 2 and drawn to position A2, B2 or C2 in the group stage.
The teams from the next three associations (Chile, Uruguay, and Peru) were seeded into Pot 3 and drawn to position A3, B3 or C3 in the group stage.
The teams from the last two associations (Colombia and Bolivia) and the additional team from the host association (Ecuador) were seeded into Pot 4 and drawn to position A4, B4 or C4 in the group stage.
From pots 2, 3 and 4, the first team drawn was placed into Group A, the second team drawn placed into Group B and the final team drawn placed into Group C. Teams from the same association could not be drawn into the same group.

The draw resulted in the following groups:

Match officials
On 28 December 2021, CONMEBOL informed to its member associations the referees appointed for the tournament. Assistant referee Guilherme Dias Camilo was replaced by Bruno Boschilia, both from Brazil.

 Nicolás Lamolina
Assistants: José Miguel Savorani and Sebastián Raineri
 Dilio Rodríguez
Assistants: Carlos Tapia and Rubén Flores
 Flavio de Souza
Assistants: Rafael Alves and Bruno Boschilia
 Cristian Garay
Assistants: Miguel Rocha and Juan Serrano
 Carlos Ortega
Assistants: Miguel Roldán and David Fuentes

 Marlon Vera
Assistants: David Vacacela and Edison Vásquez
 Carlos Paul Benítez
Assistants: Luis Onieva and José Villagra
 Augusto Menéndez
Assistants: Enrique Pinto and Leonar Soto
 Gustavo Tejera
Assistants: Pablo Llarena and Andrés Nievas
 Yender Herrera
Assistants: Yackson Díaz and Antoni García

Support Referees

 Jhon Hinestroza

 Edwin Ordóñez

Squads

Players born on or after 1 January 2002 were eligible to compete. Each team could register a maximum of 20 and a minimum of 16 players, two of whom should have been goalkeepers (Regulations Article 31).

Group stage
The winners of each group and the best runner-up among all groups will advance to the semi-finals.

Tiebreakers
In the group stage, the teams will be ranked according to points earned (3 points for a win, 1 point for a draw, 0 points for a loss). If tied on points, tiebreakers will be applied in the following order (Regulations Article 20):
Goal difference;
Goals scored;
Head-to-head result in games between tied teams;
Fewest number of red cards received;
Fewest number of yellow cards received;
Drawing of lots.

All match times are in ECT (UTC−5), as listed by CONMEBOL.

Group A

Group B

Group C

Ranking of group runners-up

Final stage
The final stage consisted of the semi-finals, the third place match and the final. The semi-final matchups will be:
Group A winner vs. Group C winner
Group B winner vs. Best runner-up

The semi-final winners and losers played in the final and third place match respectively. If a game was tied after full time, extra time would not be played, and a penalty shoot-out would be used to determine the winner (Regulations Article 23).

The final matchday, which consisted of the third place match and the final, was moved from Estadio Banco Guayaquil to Estadio Rodrigo Paz Delgado due to the original venue's field was damaged as a result of the heavy rains that occurred in Quito.

All match times are in ECT (UTC−5), as listed by CONMEBOL.

Bracket

Semi-finals

Third place match

Final

Statistics

Top goalscorers

Final ranking
As per statistical convention in football, matches decided in extra time were counted as wins and losses, while matches decided by penalty shoot-out were counted as draws.

References

External links
CONMEBOL Libertadores Sub 20 Ecuador 2022, CONMEBOL.com

2022
U-20
2022 in youth association football
2022 in South American football
International club association football competitions hosted by Ecuador
February 2022 sports events in South America
C